Irvine "Ike" Bartle (c. 1880–1949) was an English professional rugby league footballer who played as a forward in the 1890s and 1900s. He played at representative level for England, and at club level for Halifax.

Playing career

International honours
Ike Bartle won a cap for England while at Halifax in 1906 against Other Nationalities.

Challenge Cup Final appearances
Ike Bartle played as a forward, i.e. number 8, in Halifax's 7-0 victory over Salford in the 1902–03 Challenge Cup Final during the 1902–03 season at Headingley Rugby Stadium, Leeds on Saturday 25 April 1903, in front of a crowd of 32,507, and played as a forward, i.e. number 8, in the 8-3 victory over Warrington in the 1903–04 Challenge Cup Final during the 1903–04 season at The Willows, Salford on Saturday 30 April 1904, in front of a crowd of 17,041.

References

External links

1880s births
1949 deaths
England national rugby league team players
English rugby league players
Halifax R.L.F.C. players
Place of birth missing
Rugby league forwards